Coasts in the Mist is a 1986 Soviet drama film directed by Yuli Karasik.

Plot 
The film takes place in 1921. Wrangel's army is defeated and takes refuge in Bulgaria. Belogvardeets Sergey Egoriev lives here with his son and daughter. Dmitry Shelopugin's family took Sergei's lost wife and his youngest daughter, and Dmitry himself goes to Bulgaria to agitate Russian soldiers.

Cast 
 Anatoly Kuznetsov as Polkovnik Egoriev
 Leonid Filatov as Chekist Shelapugin
 Boris Lukanov as Anton
 Irina Kupchenko as Tamara Skarzhinskaya
 Tanya Dimitrova as Rayna
 Peter Batakliev as Lyubcho
 Stefan Danailov as Sokrat
 Lyubomir Mladenov as Tsar Boris III
 Lyubomir Dimitrov as Kalfov
 Nikola Todev as Stavrov

References

External links 
 

1986 films
1980s Russian-language films
1980s Bulgarian-language films
Soviet drama films
Mosfilm films
1986 drama films
Soviet multilingual films
Bulgarian multilingual films